Sherisse Stevens (born Sherisse Laurence) is a Canadian singer and entertainer.

From 1978 to 1983 she hosted the show Circus on CTV in Canada. At that time she was billed as Sherisse Lawrence.

In 1986 she represented Luxembourg at the Eurovision Song Contest. Her song "L'amour de ma vie" (The Love of My Life), performed first on the night, was written by Frank Dostal and Alain Garcia and composed by Rolf Soja. The song finished third with 117 points.

In 2006 she was appointed the musical director of the Huntsville Community Choir in Ontario.

Discography

Singles

References

External links
 
 L'amour de ma vie lyric

Canadian women country singers
Living people
Year of birth missing (living people)
People from Selkirk, Manitoba
Eurovision Song Contest entrants for Luxembourg
Eurovision Song Contest entrants of 1986
Stevens, Sherisse
20th-century Canadian women singers
21st-century Canadian women singers
Musicians from Manitoba